This page is dedicated to the state primary schools in the region of Angus, Scotland.